Kards is a free-to-play World War II-themed online digital collectible card game developed and published by 1939 Games. It was released in early access on Steam on April 12, 2019, and was fully released on April 15, 2020. Mobile ports are expected to be released in August 2022 with crossplay capabilities between platforms.

Gameplay 
Kards is a turned-based collectible card game. It is played between two players, each with a deck of 40 cards themed around strategies of powers during World War II: Nazi Germany, Great Britain, Soviet Union, the United States, Imperial Japan, France, Poland and Fascist Italy. For example, a German deck relies on Blitzkrieg to overwhelm the opponent with tanks. The objective is to destroy the enemy's headquarters represented by a card on the board.

The playing field, called "battlefield" in-game, is divided into three fronts, the player's support line, front line, and the enemy's support line. The support and front line can hold up to four and five cards respectively, but units must be deployed in the player's support line when played. In order to play cards, players expend a resource called 'Kredit;' that refreshes every turn, after which the maximum Kredit increases by one, up to 12. Kredits can also be used to move military units to the front line or to attack enemy units. Once a unit has been moved to the front line, they cannot retreat back unless forced to by certain cards that specify otherwise. The front line can only be controlled by one player at a time, as such, whoever controls it has a strategic advantage on the battlefield.

Game modes 
Players can compete against a computer AI or against human opponents online based on a tiered-ranking system. Players' rank will reset after each one-month long season. Alternatively, players can play in a draft against other human players where they have to build a deck from scratch by picking one card out of three randomly chosen ones at a time until they have a complete deck, after which they will use it until they win 7 games or lose 3 games, earning rewards based on their performance.

There is also five single player campaigns that players can progress through, each themed around major military campaigns from the war.

Development and release 
1939 Games was founded in 2015 by former CEO Ívar Kristjánsson and Project Lead Guðmundur Kristjánsson of CCP Games, best known for developing Eve Online, with Kards being their first project.

At first, Kards started out as a cardboard prototype using real life cards and went into full production as an online CCG after receiving a $70,000 grant, making its first public appearance in March 2019.

Over the course of its development, Kards received over $5 million in endowments from venture funds, including the Chinese investing company Tencent, to support future updates and a mobile version of the game.

Card artwork was sourced and licensed from World War II enlistment posters, propaganda art, and toy box art from the 1970s and 1980s, including box art of Airfix scale model kits famously painted by Roy Cross. Artwork is also commissioned from private artists as a last resort. Most of the commissioned art comes from David Pentland and Jarosław Wróbel.

The game released on April 15, 2020, on PC with continued post-launch support in the form of expansions, timed-limited events, and hotfixes. Prior to its official release, the game received over 250,000 downloads on Steam with a record peak of over 2,700 concurrent players.

Reception 

Kards received "generally favorable reviews" for PC according to the review aggregation website Metacritic. The game was praised for its polished presentation and fair monetization model, being comparable to other games of the same genre such as Hearthstone and Magic: The Gathering Arena while differentiating with its style of gameplay.

References

External links 
 

2020 video games
Android (operating system) games
Digital collectible card games
Free-to-play video games
IOS games
MacOS games
Windows games
Video games containing loot boxes
Video games developed in Iceland
Indie video games
World War II video games